Sir Keith Jacka Holyoake,  (11 February 1904 – 8 December 1983) was the 26th prime minister of New Zealand, serving for a brief period in 1957 and then from 1960 to 1972, and also the 13th governor-general of New Zealand, serving from 1977 to 1980. He is the only New Zealand politician to date to have held both positions.

Holyoake was born near Pahiatua in the Wairarapa. He left formal education at age 12 to help on the family farm. Before entering politics, he was active in various local farming associations. Holyoake was first elected to Parliament in 1932, representing the conservative Reform Party. He played an instrumental role in the formation of the National Party in 1936. He lost his seat two years later but was earmarked for the safe seat of Pahiatua, which he held from 1943. Following National's first election victory, Holyoake entered Cabinet in 1949. In 1954, he was appointed the first deputy prime minister of New Zealand, under Sidney Holland. Following an election defeat, he served as the leader of the Opposition for three years before National returned to power in 1960.

Holyoake's government rewrote the criminal legal code, passing the Crimes Act 1961. One of the main features of this act was the abolition of capital punishment, though only ten National MPs voted for its abolition. Among many conservative reforms, his government introduced a form of "voluntary unionism". In foreign policy, Holyoake supported the United States and sent troops to Vietnam. Holyoake led his party to four consecutive election victories (not since surpassed). In 1972, he resigned as prime minister to ease the succession for his deputy and friend, Jack Marshall.

In 1977, the National government of Robert Muldoon appointed Holyoake as governor-general, creating controversy as opponents argued that a former politician should not hold the non-partisan position. Holyoake's term was limited to three years, not the normal five. In 1980, he became a Knight of the Order of the Garter, a rare honour.

Holyoake is to date the third longest serving New Zealand prime minister (just under 12 years), surpassed only by Richard Seddon's 13 years and William Massey's close to 13 years; he was also the first to be born in the 20th century. Holyoake was known for his diplomatic style and "plummy" voice. He was also fondly (or mockingly) known as Kiwi Keith, a name given to him in childhood to distinguish him from an Australian cousin with the same name.

Early life
Holyoake was born at Mangamutu, a short distance from Pahiatua, a town in New Zealand's Wairarapa region, the son of Henry Victor Holyoake and Esther Eves. Holyoake's great-grandparents, Richard and Eliza Holyoake, settled at Riwaka near Motueka in 1843, and his maternal great-grandparents, William and Sarah Eves, arrived in Nelson in 1842. Relatives of the 19th-century secularist George Holyoake, the Holyoakes ran a small general store at Mangamutu, and then lived for a time in both Hastings and Tauranga, before settling on the family farm at Riwaka, following the death of Holyoake's grandfather in 1913.

Holyoake was raised in the Plymouth Brethren church, and his social life as a child was very restricted. At age 12, having left school after his father's death, Holyoake worked on the family hop and tobacco farm in Riwaka. His mother had trained as a school teacher, and continued his education at home. After taking over the management of the farm, he became involved in various local farming associations, something that increased his interest in politics.

Early political career

The incumbent MP, George Black, held the seat, but died the following year. Holyoake was the Reform Party's candidate in the resulting by-election in 1932, and was successful. He became the youngest Member of Parliament at the time, at the age of 28. In 1935, he was awarded the King George V Silver Jubilee Medal.

In the aftermath of this election, he played a key role in transforming the coalition into the modern National Party. He very quickly gained considerable respect from his colleagues, and was regarded as a rising star in the new party. Holyoake had been discussed as a possible successor to the party's conscientious but lack-lustre leader, Adam Hamilton, but without being an MP, this was no longer considered an option.

In 1943 he returned to Parliament as MP for Pahiatua, having been lined up by National for that nomination. In 1946, he became the party's deputy Leader.

First National Government: 1949–1957
Holyoake was also for a year (1949–50) Minister for Scientific and Industrial Research, and was Minister of Marketing until the department was abolished in 1953.

As Minister of Agriculture for eight years Holyoake enhanced his reputation as a level-headed good administrator. Farm mechanisation was encouraged, the "extermination policy" achieved nearly eliminated the rabbit pest. Dismantling of marketing producer controls was completed.

Holyoake twice went to London to re-negotiate price levels on meat and wool products, and in 1955 attended the Food and Agricultural Organisation conference in Rome. On his return to New Zealand he visited India and the Soviet Union to seek alternative markets for New Zealand, although his trip bore little fruit. In 1957 he led a delegation seeking to protect New Zealand's access to the British market without notable success.

As Deputy leader of the National Party, Holyoake was acting prime minister whenever Holland was overseas. In recognition of this was made a member of the Privy Council in 1954, only after the  Holland made him the first person to be formally appointed Deputy Prime Minister.

In 1953, in partnership with his friend Theodore Nisbet Gibbs and Gibbs' son Ian, Holyoake purchased a block of land on the northern shore of Lake Taupō from Ian's employer. The land, which had previously been purchased from Ngāti Tūwharetoa iwi in 1884, was a block of 5,385 acres largely covered in scrub and fern. Holyoake and Gibbs subsequently developed the land into a town called Kinloch, which became a holiday destination. On his deathbed, Holyoake said that Kinloch was his proudest achievement.

First period as prime minister

The election was won by the Walter Nash-led Labour Party by a margin of two seats. Holyoake became Leader of the Opposition for the next three years.

Second National Government: 1960–1972

Historians attribute the victory to Holyoake's skilful campaigning, particularly his attacks on Minister of Finance Arnold Nordmeyer's so-called "Black Budget" of 1958, which had increased taxes on petrol, cigarettes and liquor.

Second period as prime minister
The Holyoake government implemented numerous reforms of the public services and government institutions: for example, it created the Office of the Ombudsman and numerous quasi-autonomous non-governmental organisations, and strengthened parliamentary scrutiny of the executive. Public broadcasting was removed from direct government oversight and placed under corporation control. Holyoake's government rewrote the criminal legal code, passing the Crimes Act 1961; the Act abolished capital punishment, though only ten National MPs voted for its abolition. In 1969, the Security Intelligence Service (SIS) was formally acknowledged to exist, and its minister, the prime minister, publicly acknowledged. That same year the New Zealand Parliament passed an Act covering the agency's functions and responsibilities: the New Zealand Security Intelligence Service Act.

In 1960, the Holyoake government published the "Hunn Report", a wide-ranging summary of Māori assets, and the state of Māori in New Zealand at the time. The report was a damning indictment of past governments' neglect of Māori within society, and Holyoake endeavoured to act on its findings. By embracing the No Maoris – No Tour cause, Holyoake ended the practice of an apartheid sporting body dictating the racial composition of New Zealand rugby teams touring in South Africa. In a 1966 speech directed at the South African authorities, Holyoake delicately defended the principle of racial equality, stating "in this country we are one people; as such we cannot as a nation be truly represented in any sphere by a group chosen on racial lines".

Holyoake accepted the post-war political consensus; he believed in the necessity of a mixed economy, championing a Keynesian strategy of public investment to maintain demand. However, as an anti-socialist, Holyoake sought to reduce the role of trade unions in industrial relations. The National government introduced a form of voluntary unionism, though the majority of industrial workplaces remained unionised; the policy was hotly debated within caucus, with Holyoake's deputy, Jack Marshall, and Tom Shand, favouring the retention of compulsory unionism. His government's industrial policy brought Holyoake into conflict with union leaders, such as Fintan Patrick Walsh.

Holyoake's government was comfortably re-elected for a second consecutive term in 1963. Holyoake's second term featured by a long period of prosperity and economic expansion. However, moves by the United Kingdom to join the European Economic Community challenged his government. Holyoake deliberately played down the issue, and chose not to vocally oppose British membership of the EEC. A significant step towards diversification was a limited free trade agreement with Australia, negotiated in 1965 by Holyoake's minister of overseas trade, Jack Marshall, who later also negotiated the terms of the arrangements for New Zealand under which Britain joined the EEC.

More controversial were the Holyoake government's relations with the United States at the start of the Vietnam War. The National government's initial response was carefully considered and characterised by Holyoake's cautiousness towards the entire Vietnam question. The fundamental issues, Holyoake said, were simple: "Whose will is to prevail in South Vietnam the imposed will of the North Vietnamese communists and their agents, or the freely expressed will of the people of South Vietnam?" His government preferred minimal involvement, with other South East Asian deployments already having a strain on the New Zealand Defence Force.

Beginning in mid-1960s, the New Zealand government protested against French nuclear weapons testing in the Pacific region. In 1963, Holyoake announced the policy of banning the storage or testing of nuclear weapons within New Zealand territory.

As the prime minister during the Apollo 11 moon landing, he contributed to messages from 73 world leaders that were etched into a silicon disk left on the surface of the moon. The disk was left in the Sea of Tranquility by Buzz Aldrin.

Two years prior Holyoake appointed a rising backbencher, Robert Muldoon as Minister of Finance in 1967, although ranked him lowly in his Cabinet. In response to falling wool prices and balance of payment problems, Muldoon introduced mini-budgets with Holyoake's approval.

The National government was humiliated in early 1970 in a disastrous by-election. Having already received the customary Companion of Honour, Holyoake was knighted as a Knight Grand Cross of the Order of St Michael and St George in the 1970 Queen's Birthday Honours. Political commentators speculated about when Holyoake would retire, and by the early 1970s his closest allies, including Jack Marshall, were privately encouraging him to step down. The government was perceived as careworn—two of its strongest ministers had died, and the party caucus was increasingly divided. After more than a decade in power, Holyoake's dogged conservatism appeared out of touch with an increasingly liberal society. However, it was not until 1972 that he resigned to ease the succession for Marshall. By then he had become the senior statesman of the Commonwealth. Holyoake remained in Cabinet as Minister of Foreign Affairs until National lost office at the end of the year.

Retirement

Marshall retained him on the frontbench and appointed him Shadow Minister of Foreign Affairs. He became doubtful of Marshall's chance to regain government with time and threw his influence with the caucus behind Marshall's deputy Muldoon. In 1974 Marshall resigned as leader after realising that many of his colleagues (including Holyoake) no longer had confidence in him and Muldoon was elected in his place. Muldoon appointed Holyoake to the specially-created sinecure of Minister of State.

Governor-general

In 1977, Holyoake was unexpectedly and controversially appointed Governor-General of New Zealand by Queen Elizabeth II on the advice of the then Prime Minister Robert Muldoon. The announcement was made by the Queen at the end of her tour of New Zealand on 7 March 1977, from the Royal Yacht HMY Britannia in Lyttelton Harbour.

This choice was deemed controversial by some, as Holyoake was a sitting Cabinet minister and a former prime minister. Many opponents of Muldoon's government claimed that it was a political appointment. That suggestion was, in turn, criticised by the government, as Hillary had backed Labour in 1975 as part of the "Citizens for Rowling" campaign.

As a result of the appointment, Holyoake resigned from Parliament, leading to the Pahiatua by-election of 1977. He was succeeded from his seat by John Falloon.

Holyoake's conduct while in office, however, was acknowledged to be fair and balanced. In particular, Holyoake refused to comment on the 1978 general election, which gave Labour a narrow plurality of votes but a majority of seats in parliament to National. Social Credit leader Bruce Beetham said Holyoake as governor-general had "...a scrupulous impartiality that confounded the critics of his appointment". His term as governor-general was only for three years, on account of his age. Usually, governors-general serve for five years, but Holyoake was the oldest governor-general to date (at 73 years old). His term ended in 1980.

Death
Holyoake died on 8 December 1983, aged 79, in Wellington. His state funeral took place on 13 December 1983 in Wellington Cathedral of St Paul.

Personal life
Holyoake twice married Norma Janet Ingram: first in a civil ceremony on 24 September 1934, and again on 11 January 1935 at their Presbyterian church in Motueka. The couple had five children: two sons and three daughters. His daughter Diane married National MP Ken Comber. In the 1980 Queen's Birthday Honours, Norma, Lady Holyoake, was appointed a Dame Commander of the Order of St Michael and St George, for public services since 1935. 

Holyoake also had a very close and somewhat paternalistic friendship with Marilyn Waring, National's youngest female MP during her tenure. Holyoake cared for her deeply. They first met in 1974 when she, nauseated by Labour Prime Minister Norman Kirk's refusal to support National MP Venn Young's bill to decriminalise homosexuality, joined the National Party. She quickly entered the Opposition Research Unit as a part-time advisor under George Gair, the Shadow Minister of Housing. At age 22, she expressed some interest to stand for the party in the seat of Raglan, a very safe National seat that contained her hometown of Huntly. Holyoake, so overjoyed by a woman willing to run for National in a safe blue seat, personally arrived within the hour to Parliament House and offered her the selection without even formally introducing himself. The two thereafter became very close, to the extent that on one occasion she kissed Holyoake on the lips in front of cameras. She is thought to have helped soften Holyoake's ambivalent views on LGBT rights; after she was involuntarily outed by the New Zealand Truth in 1978, Holyoake worked with Prime Minister Robert Muldoon to quickly downplay the tabloid reports and to protect their friend.

Decorations, awards and memberships
 Member of Her Majesty's Most Honourable Privy Council (PC), 1954 New Years Honours List
 Freeman of the City of London
 Doctor of Laws, Honoris Causa, Victoria University of Wellington, New Zealand
 Doctor of Laws (Agric), Honoris Causa, Seoul National University, South Korea
 Member of the Order of the Companions of Honour (CH), 1963 New Years Honours List
 Knight of the Most Venerable Order of St John of Jerusalem (KStJ)
 Knight Grand Cross of the Order of St Michael and St George (GCMG), 1970
 Companion of the Queen's Service Order
 Knight of the Order of the Garter (KG), 1980

Arms

Footnotes

Notes

References

References

External links

 Governor-General's website profile
 Biography in 1966 Encyclopaedia of New Zealand

|-

|-

|-

|-

|-

1904 births
1983 deaths
New Zealand anti-communists
Companions of the Queen's Service Order
Governors-General of New Zealand
New Zealand Knights of the Garter
New Zealand Members of the Order of the Companions of Honour
Knights of Justice of the Order of St John
New Zealand members of the Privy Council of the United Kingdom
New Zealand farmers
New Zealand foreign ministers
New Zealand Knights Grand Cross of the Order of St Michael and St George
New Zealand National Party MPs
Reform Party (New Zealand) MPs
New Zealand National Party leaders
People from Pahiatua
People of the Vietnam War
Prime Ministers of New Zealand
Leaders of the Opposition (New Zealand)
Deputy Prime Ministers of New Zealand
Members of the New Zealand House of Representatives
New Zealand MPs for South Island electorates
New Zealand MPs for North Island electorates
Unsuccessful candidates in the 1938 New Zealand general election
Unsuccessful candidates in the 1931 New Zealand general election
New Zealand politicians awarded knighthoods